The bronzeback snake-lizard (Ophidiocephalus taeniatus) is a species of lizards in the family Pygopodidae endemic to Australia. It is monotypic in the genus Ophidiocephalus'''.

References

Pygopodids of Australia
Ophidiocephalus
Vulnerable fauna of Australia
Reptiles described in 1897
Taxonomy articles created by Polbot